The Socialist Federal Republic of Yugoslavia participated at ten Mediterranean Games from 1951 to 1991, with the exception of 1955. Yugoslavia was the host of the Mediterranean Games in 1979 in Split, when it finished first on the medal podium.

After the breakup of Yugoslavia, its republics continued to compete at the Mediterranean Games:

Overview

By event

Medals by sport

See also
 Yugoslavia at the Olympics